Ngư Thủy is a commune (xã) and village in Lệ Thủy District, Quảng Bình Province, in Vietnam.

Populated places in Quảng Bình province
Communes of Quảng Bình province